Béla Katzirz (born 27 April 1953) is a former Hungarian international football player.

Career
Katzirz began his career with the Hungarian first division club Pécsi Munkás SC, where he played for 10.5 seasons. In 1983, Katzirz joined the Portuguese Liga side Sporting Clube de Portugal, replacing departed fellow Hungarian international Ferenc Mészáros. He remained with Sporting for three seasons before returning to Hungary.

Katzirz made several appearances for the Hungary national football team, including three 1982 World Cup qualifying matches and several Euro 1980 and Euro 1984 qualifying matches. He was part of the Hungary squad at the 1982 World Cup finals, but was an unused reserve.

Personal
His son, Dávid Katzirz, is a professional handball player.

References

External links

1953 births
Living people
Footballers from Budapest
Hungarian footballers
Hungarian expatriate footballers
Hungary international footballers
1982 FIFA World Cup players
Pécsi MFC players
Sporting CP footballers
Primeira Liga players
Expatriate footballers in Portugal
Hungarian expatriate sportspeople in Portugal
Association football goalkeepers